Podhajce is a city in Ternopil Oblast, Ukraine.

Podhajce may also refer to:
 Battle of Podhajce (disambiguation)

See also
 Podgaj (disambiguation)
 Podgaje (disambiguation)
 Podhajcer Shul, a former synagogue in Manhattan, New York City